The 2021 Miami Hurricanes football team (variously "Miami", "The U", "UM", "'Canes") represented the University of Miami during the 2021 NCAA Division I FBS football season. The Hurricanes were led by third-year head coach Manny Diaz (until he was dismissed on December 6) and played their home games at Hard Rock Stadium, competing as a member of the Atlantic Coast Conference (ACC).

The Hurricanes finished their regular season with a 7–5 overall record and accepted a bid to play in the Sun Bowl, where they were scheduled to face the Washington State Cougars. On December 26, the Hurricanes announced their withdrawal from the bowl, due to COVID-19 issues; organizers stated that they would try to secure a replacement team to face Washington State. The following day, the Central Michigan Chippewas were named as the Sun Bowl replacement team.

Previous season
The Hurricanes finished the 2020 season 8–3, and 7–2 to finish in third place in ACC play. They received an invitation to the 2020 Cheez-It Bowl where they lost to Oklahoma State.

Offseason

Position key

Coaching changes
Blake Baker former defensive coordinator for the Hurricanes, accepted a position as a linebackers coach for the LSU Tigers after Manny Diaz announced he would start taking over play calling duties for the Hurricanes.

Players

Transfers

Outgoing

The Miami Hurricanes lost six players via transfer from the 2020 season.

2021 NFL Draft

The following Hurricanes players were selected in the 2021 NFL Draft.

Preseason

Award Watch Lists

Personnel

Roster

Schedule

Source:

Game summaries

vs. No. 1 Alabama (Chick-fil-A Kickoff Game)

Appalachian State

Michigan State

Central Connecticut

Virginia

North Carolina

No. 18 NC State

No. 17 Pittsburgh

Georgia Tech

Florida State

Virginia Tech

Duke

Rankings

Players drafted into the NFL

References

Miami
Miami Hurricanes football seasons
Miami Hurricanes football